The Goltyr Painter was an Attic vase painter of the black-figure style. He was active in the second quarter of the sixth century BC. He is well known for his work on Tyrrhenian amphorae. He mostly painted animals, often with rather bulbous heads.

Bibliography 
 John Beazley: Attic Black-Figure Vase-Painters, Oxford, 1956, p. 94-106.
 John Boardman: Schwarzfigurige Vasen aus Athen. Ein Handbuch, Mainz, 1977, p. 41.
 Jeroen Kluiver: The Tyrrhenian Group of Black-figure Vases. From the Athenian Kerameikos to the Tombs of South Etruria, Amsterdam, 2003

Notes

External links
Images and descriptions of a Goltyr Painter vase held by the Tampa Museum of Art. Perseus Digital Library.

Anonymous artists of antiquity
Artists of ancient Attica
6th-century BC Greek people